St. John's College is one of two residential colleges at the University of British Columbia which are modeled on the Oxbridge collegiate system, the other being Green College. It provides a community for graduate students and postdoctoral researchers, with an international focus. St. John's College maintains close ties with Green College and the University of Cambridge in the United Kingdom.

The college consists of a residential community of 160 graduate students, postdoctoral researchers, visiting scholars and professors, and non-resident affiliated faculty and academic programming. The College is located at the West end of the UBC campus, near Wreck Beach. Aside from taking up residence at St. John's, residential membership entails active involvement in the social and academic aspects of College life. Involvement takes the form of participation on various social and academic committees, and attendance at functions and lectures sponsored by or otherwise linked with the College. Dining together is an integral part of the St. John's College experience. The college is home to the Dining Society which provides meals five days a week to residents and guests.

Activities

Academic Lectures and Interdisciplinary Groups
Fellows regularly organize talks and forums on current events around the globe, building upon the College’s international diversity as well as UBC’s global scholarly expertise. Drawing upon the strong bonds of trust and communication developed within the SJC community, Fellows and guests of the College are able to discuss difficult, and often contentious, issues in an atmosphere of mutual respect in which everyone can listen to and learn from each other.

Social and Community Activities
A diverse array of resident groups and committees are active at the college. Associations include: Academic Committee, Arts Committee, Environment Committee, Outreach Committee, Choir, Sports Committee as well as Chinese, French and German conversation groups.

Location and Facilities 

St. John's College is located on the west end of UBC's Point Grey campus, bordering the Marine Drive residences and across from Wreck Beach.

Similar to colleges at Oxford and Cambridge, St. Johns grounds include residences for its students and fellows, social rooms and kitchens for residents, formal dining hall, lecture hall, meeting rooms and social lounges. The college also provides catering to events held at the college for the rest of the university.

Organization 
The college is a unit of the Faculty of Graduate Studies. The head of the college is the College Principal who is responsible to the Dean of Graduate Studies. Management of the college is guided through an Advisory Board consisting of faculty, community leaders, college residents, and representatives from parallel institutions. Academic components of the college are managed through a variety of joint faculty – resident committees.

History 
St. John's College - UBC was founded by alumni of St. John's University, Shanghai, which was shut down by the China in Beijing in 1952. To keep the school's traditions alive, SJU alumni (called Johanneans) funded three academic institutions around the world bearing the name of St. John's. They established St. John's University in Taiwan in 1967 and St. John's College UBC in 1997.

Notable alumni
Dr. Mathabo Tsepa—High Commissioner of Lesotho to Canada

References

External links
 Official website
 The website of a former resident: http://martin.swift.is/sjc/ (pictures from 2004 to 2006).

University of British Columbia
1997 establishments in British Columbia
Residential colleges